Monica Vallarin (born 1 February 1965) is an Italian swimmer. She competed in two events at the 1980 Summer Olympics.

References

External links
 

1965 births
Living people
Italian female swimmers
Olympic swimmers of Italy
Swimmers at the 1980 Summer Olympics
Place of birth missing (living people)